Enas Mostafa (born 1 January 1989) is an Egyptian freestyle wrestler.

She competed at the 2016 Summer Olympics in Rio de Janeiro, in the women's freestyle 69 kg. She finished in 5th place after losing to Natalia Vorobieva of Russia in the semifinals.

She competed at the 2020 Summer Olympics in the women's 68 kg event.

References

External links

1989 births
Living people
Egyptian female sport wrestlers
Olympic wrestlers of Egypt
Wrestlers at the 2016 Summer Olympics
Wrestlers at the 2020 Summer Olympics
20th-century Egyptian women
21st-century Egyptian women